Eral is a town  in the Tuticorin district in the state of Tamil Nadu, India.Eral is mini colombo in tamil nadu

Demographics
 India census, Eral had a population of 9284. Males constitute 49% of the population and females 51%. Eral has an average literacy rate of 81%, higher than the national average of 59.5%: male literacy is 84%, and female literacy is 78%. In Eral, 11% of the population is under 6 years of age.

References

 Cities and towns in Thoothukudi district